David John Jervis (born 18 January 1982) is an English former professional footballer who played in the Football League for Mansfield Town.

References

1982 births
Living people
English footballers
Association football defenders
English Football League players
Mansfield Town F.C. players
Gainsborough Trinity F.C. players
Kettering Town F.C. players